Tyaskin is an unincorporated community and census-designated place in Wicomico County, Maryland, United States. Its population was 236 as of the 2010 census. It is part of the Salisbury, Maryland-Delaware Metropolitan Statistical Area.

Beaudley was listed on the National Register of Historic Places in 2001.

Demographics

References

 Barbara Marhoefer, Tyaskin, Maryland, in Photos and Documents: The Story of a Little Town on the Nanticoke River Near the Chesapeake Bay (http://barbaramarhoefer.com/Tyaskin.html)

Census-designated places in Wicomico County, Maryland
Census-designated places in Maryland
Salisbury metropolitan area
Maryland populated places on the Chesapeake Bay